The Nindigully Pub, built in 1864 in the town of Nindigully within the locality of Thallon, Shire of Balonne, Queensland, Australia, is believed to be one of state's longest continually licensed premises. It was a Cobb & Co changing station between the late 19th century and the early 20th century.

Events 
The Nindigully Pig Races and Country Music Festival, and fireworks are held annually on the last Saturday in November at the pub. It raises money for the Royal Flying Doctor Service.

Filming 
In the 1990s, scenes from Paperback Hero starring Hugh Jackman and Claudia Karvan were filmed on location at the Nindigully Pub.

See also

List of public houses in Australia

References

External links

Pubs in Queensland
1864 establishments in Australia
Hotel buildings completed in 1864
Hotels in Queensland